Beli Kamen is a remote abandoned former settlement in the Municipality of Kočevje in southern Slovenia. The area is part of the traditional region of Lower Carniola and is now included in the Southeast Slovenia Statistical Region. Its territory is now part of the village of Stari Log.

History
Beli Kamen was a village inhabited by Gottschee Germans. It had 23 houses before the Second World War. The village was burned by Italian troops during the Rog Offensive in the second half of August 1942 and was not rebuilt after the war.

References

External links
Beli Kamen on Geopedia
Pre–World War II List of oeconyms and family names in Beli Kamen

Former populated places in the Municipality of Kočevje